John Wick is an American role-playing game designer best known for his creative contributions to the tabletop role playing games Legend of the Five Rings and 7th Sea. He self-published Orkworld under the Wicked Press banner, and later co-founded the Wicked Dead Brewing Company with Jared Sorensen. His games under that company include Cat, Schauermärchen, Enemy Gods, and Thirty. He has won the Origins Award for Best Role-Playing Game and Best Collectible Card Game twice (for both the Legend of the Five Rings and 7th Sea role-playing games and collectible card games).

He has also written for White Wolf, Inc., Pinnacle Entertainment Group, and worked for various video game companies, providing storyline and dialogue. He has written two regular online columns: The Game Designer's Journal (for The Gaming Outpost) and Play Dirty (for Pyramid Magazine).

Legend of the Five Rings
In 1995, Wick was a freelance writer living in Southern California. He had submitted articles to Shadis Magazine, Alderac Entertainment Group's independent game magazine, attracting the attention of the magazine's assistant editor, D.J. Trindle. He was brought on as a staff writer at D.J.'s request. Soon after joining AEG, he got involved with the production and design of the Legend of the Five Rings Collectible Card Game, along with the rest of the company. He worked with Matthew D. Wilson, the game's art director and David Williams, the game's lead designer. He served as "Continuity Editor", which meant that he was responsible for the game's characters and plot details.

Wick served as L5R's Continuity Editor for the Emerald Edition, Obsidian Edition, and Jade Edition sets, including the Shadowlands, Forbidden Knowledge, Anvil of Despair, Crimson & Jade, and Time of the Void expansions. He was also the primary source for storyline, flavor text and character for The Scorpion Coup set.

Wick also led the design team that created the Legend of the Five Rings Roleplaying Game (1997).

Wick left the L5R design team shortly thereafter to work on AEG's forthcoming 7th Sea project.

7th Sea
7th Sea (1998), the second RPG published by AEG, was designed by John and Jennifer Wick, and Kevin Wilson. 7th Sea is AEG's swashbuckling setting. Initially proposed by Wick and his wife Jennifer, the game was intended to be self-contained, but quickly evolved into a much larger project. Telling the story of the world of Théah, a fantasy amalgam of Restoration Age Europe, 7th Sea included pirates, musketeers, explorers and magic.

Wick wrote and developed much of the project, including the 7th Sea Players Guide, Game Masters Guide, Avalon Sourcebook, GM screen, and Knights of the Rose and Cross sourcebook. He left AEG after his work on the Avalon Sourcebook was finished.

On November 3, 2015, AEG announced that it had sold the rights to the 7th Sea property back to Wick, and entered a partnership with him to publish certain licensed games using the property.

On April 2, 2019, Chaosium announced on their official blog their acquisition of the rights to the 7th Sea product line from John Wick.

Orkworld
After leaving AEG, he acquired a position at Totally Games, helping develop an Xbox launch title. He also wrote, designed, and developed Orkworld, a reverse-fantasy game where orks are the heroes and the "monsters" are humans, dwarves, and elves. The game was released the same year as Dungeons and Dragons 3rd Edition and garnered an Origins Award nomination for Best Game Fiction.

The game was illustrated by Thomas Denmark.

Neopets 
After spending time in San Francisco, he returned to Los Angeles and began working at Neopets, writing stories for the Neopedia. He also helped develop the Neopets CCG.

Upper Deck 
Wick was also a major contributor to the award-winning Vs. System CCG (Marvel TCG and DC Comics TCG) published by The Upper Deck Company.

The Wicked Dead Brewing Company 
Wick began a new publishing venture with his friend Jared Sorensen. Calling their joint venture the Wicked Dead Brewing Company (based on Wick's previous publishing venture Wicked Press and Sorenson's Memento Mori Theatricks), they began in 2004 and have published over a dozen roleplaying games, board games, and books. He self-published a novel titled No Loyal Knight through the Wicked Dead Brewing Company.

Wick published a number of fantasy indie role-playing games using dice-pool mechanics, including Enemy Gods (2004) and Cat (2006).

John Wick Presents 
Wick started a new company—John Wick Presents—in 2009 when he kicked off his partnership with Cubicle 7 by reissuing his 2008 RPG Houses of the Blooded. He also released Curse of the Yellow Sign and Blood & Honor through this company.

Houses of the Blooded 
In 2007, Wick announced a return to "big game design" in his LiveJournal. The game, called Houses of the Blooded, was released at the 2008 Origins Game Fair. The game focuses on "the ven" (a race of magically created humanoids) and the world of Shanri (both of which have showed up in a previous game, Enemy Gods).

The pre-order for the limited edition version of Houses of the Blooded sold out in exactly one week.  There were 100 copies available on the Indie Press Revolution website on May 5, 2008 and they were all gone by May 12.  Wick was apparently surprised by this turn of events. 

Wick released a soundtrack with the new game, focusing on "ven blood opera," an in-game element. Songs from the opera can be heard on the Houses of the Blooded website.

Wick is keeping an open log of his design of this game in his LiveJournal.  He has stated his intention to release several stand alone supplements that will detail various aspects of the world of Shanri.  Each book would allow players to play a different role in Shanri and, as he stated in his livejournal, "almost feel as if they're playing a different game."  The books mentioned so far are a 'Slumming' book where players play ven nobles from cities (as opposed to 'country' ven detailed in the main book), a Wilderness book where vassals of the ven nobles fight off ork, explore dungeons, and possibly kill dragons, as well as a Suaven book where details regarding the Ancestor worship religion of the ven will be revealed.

Wick teamed up with British games publisher Cubicle 7 Entertainment for a mass market release of the game in September 2009.

Freemasonry 
In November 2005, Wick became a Freemason, joining Liberal Arts Lodge of Los Angeles, California. He is a Master Mason.

The Awful Lot 
Wick was a founding member and the drummer for the band The Awful Lot.

Awards 
Legend of the Five Rings Roleplaying Game (Author and Lead Designer)

1997 Origins Award Best Roleplaying Game

1997 RPGA Gamer's Choice Award Best Roleplaying Game

Legend of the Five Rings Collectible Card Game (Design Team and Story Editor)

1996 Origins Award Best Collectible Card Game (Battle at Beiden Pass)

1997 Origins Award Best Collectible Card Game Expansion (Time of the Void)

7th Sea Roleplaying Game (Creator, Co-Author, Lead Designer)

1999 Origins Award Best Roleplaying Game

7th Sea Collectible Card Game (Co-Creator, Design Team, Story Editor)

1999 Origins Award Best Collectible Card Game

Orkworld (Author and Designer)

2000 Best Game Fiction (How Bashthraka Lost His Spear) (nominated)

2017 Ennies 
7th Sea: Best Game (Silver), Best Rules (Gold), Best Free Product Free Rules (Gold), Best Supplement Pirate Nations (Silver), Product of the Year (Silver)

References

External links

Personal sites 
 The Tao of Zen Nihilism (LiveJournal blog)
 John Wick's YouTube Channel (vlog)

Commercial and professional sites 
 John Wick Presents (Official Website and Webstore)
 Houses of the Blooded website and forums
 The Awful Lot (MySpace)
 The Wicked Dead Brewing Company
 Pen & Paper listing for John Wick

Interviews 
 Interview with James Maliszewski
 Interview with Sons of Kryos and Game Design Seminar
 Interview with Paul Tevis
 Interview on Endgameradio
 Interview with Mark Kinney for GenCon (Almost) Live
 Interview on Pulp Gamer
 Interview at Theory from the Closet
 The Game's the Thing RandomCon 2009
 The Game's the Thing RinCon 2008 Wrap Up

Articles 
 Blowing Out the Nostalgia Candle
 Hit 'em Where It Hurts
 Five Favorite Roleplaying Games

Indie role-playing game designers
Role-playing game designers
Year of birth missing (living people)
Living people